Ecury or Écury may refer to:

People
 Boy Ecury (1922–1944), member of the Dutch Resistance in World War II
 Nydia Ecury (1926–2012), Afro-Dutch writer, translator and actress

Places
 Écury-le-Repos, Marne department, France
 Écury-sur-Coole, Marne department, France

See also
 Ecurie (disambiguation)